Milan Milkov (born December 19, 1996) is a Macedonian professional basketball Power forward who currently plays for EuroNickel 2005 in the Macedonian First League.

References

External links
 basketball.realgm.com
 basketball.eurobasket.com
 

1996 births
Sportspeople from Kavadarci
Macedonian men's basketball players
Living people
Centers (basketball)